Karlo Uljarević (born November 20, 1998) is a Croatian professional basketball player who plays for Gorica in the Croatian League and the ABA League. Standing at 1.93 cm, he plays at both guard positions.

References

External links
 Karlo Uljarević Basketball Player Profile on Eurobasket.com
 Karlo Uljarević Basketball Player Profile on RealGM.com
 Karlo Uljarević Basketball Player Profile on ABAliga.com
 

1998 births
Living people
Guards (basketball)
Croatian men's basketball players
People from Osijek
Sportspeople from Osijek
KK Gorica players
KK Cibona players
KK Zadar players
KK Škrljevo players